Al Mi Ani Oved (Hebrew: על מי אני עובד, English translation: Who am I Fooling) is the third and to-date final studio album by the Israeli singer-artist, Yoni Bloch, released in 2008.

The album is composed of two parts; one side of the CD containing the album's eleven songs, and the other side is a DVD containing eleven video clips, one for each of the album's songs. The clips are presenting the songs as an ongoing story of relationship failure between a man and a woman, (the man is probably based on Yoni Bloch himself) resulting in the man's death. The clips were directed by Alon Banari, that also wrote the scripts of the clips, along with Barak Feldman.

The band members that accompany Bloch in the songs are Tomer Lahav (Guitar), Tal Zovleski (Guitar), Tal Cohen (Drums) and Erez Frank (Bass guitar). Vocals are presented by Yael Kraus, that also sang a Duet with Bloch in "Shir A'her" (Another Song). Kraus also portrayed the women role in each of the video clips. Bloch's brother, Daniel, Played the drums in two of the eleven songs of the album.

Yoni Bloch composed all the songs in the album. Most of them were written by Barak Feldman, and some written by both Feldman and Bloch. The songs combine characteristics of rock music, such as electric guitar and yells, along with melodic Piano solos.

Furthermore, this album represents the maturing in Bloch's music style. While his first album, "Ulay Ze Ani" (Maybe it's Me), had a humoristic atmosphere of sort, this album characterized in dark and melancholic tunes and texts.

Song List 

2008 albums
Yoni Bloch albums